Y.A.M. Dato' Haji Mohammad Jan bin Abdul Ghani (born 10 August 1940 at Kampung Rokan, Johol), Dato' Johan Pahlawan Lela Perkasa Setiawan, was the 14th Undang of Luak Johol, one of the traditional states of Negeri Sembilan in Malaysia.

Mohammad Jan was installed as Dato' Baginda Tan Mas (heir apparent) on 30 December 1988, during the second month of the reign of the previous undang, Dato' Abdul bin Ali. He succeeded as undang on the death of Dato' Abdul on 13 March 2007. The official declaration was made by Dato' Jenang Saidin bin Abd'aziz and was witnessed by local government officials and the nobles of Luak Jelebu.

Prior to his accession, he worked as a teacher for several years before working for the National Bank of Malaysia. He retired in 1988, following his election as heir apparent of Luak Johol. He married Sa'adah binti Othman on 29 January 1969, and has six sons and one daughter. Mohammad Jan is the fourth of five siblings.

Mohammad Jan was deposed as Undang of Luak Johol on 27 March 2016 after he was found to have committed 13 offenses of misconduct. He was immediately succeeded as Undang by Muhammad Abdullah.

References

1940 births
Living people
People from Negeri Sembilan
Royal House of Negeri Sembilan
Malaysian people of Minangkabau descent
Malaysian Muslims